Jorrit Kelder (Hoorn, 1980), is a Dutch archaeologist and ancient historian. He is known especially for his work on Mycenaean political structures, and in particular his argument (first proposed in 2005 and elaborated on in a 2010 monograph) that the Mycenaean world was a single, unified state (rather than a patchwork of culturally similar, yet politically independent palace states, as had hitherto been proposed).

Though his professional career is in academic policy and administration, he has held, and continues to hold, various (honorary) affiliated positions. He was a visiting professor in Greek Archaeology at Ghent University in the 2019-2020 academic year, a guest researcher at Leiden University, and an associate member of the sub-faculty of Near and Middle Eastern Studies at the University of Oxford and a member of the common room of Wolfson College, Oxford.

Kelder is a member of the Board of Luwian Studies, a member of the supervisory board of the Teylers Museum and serves as a member of the advisory committee of the Dutch Art and Heritage council, the Mondriaan Fonds.
He has been the recipient of various prestigious fellowships, including a fellowship from the Alexander S. Onassis Public Benefit Foundation and a Guest Scholarship at the J. Paul Getty Museum.

Apart from his work on Mycenaean political structures, Kelder has published extensively on the Mycenaean world and its connections to contemporary civilisations, including Egypt and the Hittite Empire.

References

1980 births
Academic staff of Ghent University
21st-century Dutch archaeologists
21st-century Dutch historians
Mycenaean archaeologists
People from Hoorn
Living people